Alice's Odyssey is a Canadian family comedy fantasy film, directed by Denise Filiatrault and released in 2002. The film stars Sophie Lorain as Alice Tremblay, a single mother who becomes drawn into the fairy tale that she is reading to her young daughter as a bedtime story.

The cast also includes Martin Drainville, Pierrette Robitaille, Marc Labrèche, Mitsou Gélinas, Danielle Ouimet, Marc Béland, Pascale Desrochers, Myriam Poirier, Gordon Masten, Louise Portal, Jacques Languirand, Liliana Komorowska, France D'Amour, Pierre Lebeau, Denise Bombardier and Michel Barrette.

The film received two Jutra Award nominations at the 5th Jutra Awards in 2003, for Best Art Direction (Michel Proulx, François Barbeau) and Best Sound (Yvon Benoît, Marie-Claude Gagné, Gavin Fernandes).

References

External links

2002 films
2002 comedy films
Canadian comedy films
Quebec films
French-language Canadian films
2000s Canadian films